U.S. Route 221 (US 221) is a  spur of U.S. Route 21. It travels from Perry, Florida, at US 19/US 98/US 27 Alternate to Lynchburg, Virginia, at US 29 Business (Lynchburg Expressway). It travels through the states of Florida, Georgia, South Carolina, North Carolina, and Virginia. It travels through the cities of Valdosta, Georgia; Spartanburg, South Carolina; Marion, North Carolina; Roanoke, Virginia; and Lynchburg, Virginia.

Throughout western North Carolina, from the Virginia state line to the Blue Ridge Parkway, US 221 is a challenging drive, and can be described as one climb after another. In some places, the route skirts around large foothills.

Route description

Florida

U.S. Route 221 originates just south of the city of Perry, with its southern terminus intersecting with the cosigned U.S. Route 19 U.S. Route 98 and U.S. Route 27 Alternate, taking hidden SR 55 with it away from US 19. It continues through the city of Perry and intersects Interstate 10 and U.S. Route 90 in rural Madison County before crossing into Georgia.

Georgia

U.S. Route 221 runs through the cities of Quitman, Valdosta, Lakeland, Pearson, and Douglas in southern Georgia.

In Quitman, it joins U.S. Route 84 (cosigned Georgia State Route 38) to Valdosta. From Valdosta to Douglas, it joins with Georgia State Route 31. It also joins with Georgia State Route 135 and State Route 56.  From Pearson to Douglas, it joins with U.S. Route 441 as a four-lane highway, which was completed in 2000.

In Douglas, U.S. Route 221 runs as the eastern part of Bowens Mill Rd. and will be widened in the future.  It passes through Hazelhurst, Mount Vernon and Soperton before crossing Interstate 16, then later joins up with U.S. Route 1 and Georgia State Route 4 after passing through Louisville.  After going through Wrens, it splits off to the north, cosigned with Georgia State Route 47 and passes through Harlem before crossing Interstate 20 /Georgia State Route 402 approximately 20 miles west of Augusta.  Shortly before crossing into South Carolina, Georgia State Route 150 merges with Route 221 at the Pollards Corner intersection as Georgia 47 turns away. The passage into South Carolina takes place on top of the J. Strom Thurmond Dam, which forms the southern shore of J. Strom Thurmond Lake.

South Carolina

U.S. Route 221 enters South Carolina in rural McCormick County at the southeastern edge of Lake Strom Thurmond.  It continues north and northwestward to the town of McCormick.  From McCormick, it continues northerly to the city of Greenwood.

From Greenwood, U.S. Route 221 continues northeasterly to the city of Waterloo, South Carolina.  U.S. Truck Route 221 bypasses the city of Laurens on the east side.  It continues northerly and intersects Interstate 385 in rural Laurens County and proceeds to intersect Interstate 26 in rural Spartanburg County.

U.S. Route 221 continues through the center of the city of Spartanburg before intersecting Interstate 85 just north of the city.  It continues to the city of Chesnee before exiting the state in a rural area of Cherokee County.  The southern terminus of U.S. Alternate Route 221 intersects the main route in the city of Chesnee and exits the state a few miles to the east of the main route.

North Carolina

US 221 is a major highway in Western North Carolina. It runs through the cities and towns of Rutherfordton, Marion, Blowing Rock, Boone, and Jefferson.  The highway is predominantly two-lane, while four-lane in Marion, Blowing Rock, and Boone.  The section from the U.S. Route 321 interchange just east of Boone and into Jefferson in Ashe county is now a divided, four-lane controlled-access road, making this section a much more pleasant and scenic one. Two sections of the highway can be considered challenging and twisty:  13-mile stretch between Linville and Blowing Rock, and a 21-mile stretch between Jefferson and Twin Oaks.

U.S. Route 221 has one Alternate (continuing from South Carolina) and two Business Routes (in Marion and Jefferson).  It intersects two major highways: U.S. Route 74 near Rutherfordton and I-40 near Marion; and also intersects with the Blue Ridge Parkway four times.

Virginia

In Virginia, US 221 runs  from the North Carolina state line near Independence north to its northern terminus at US 29 Business, US 460 Business, and US 501 Business in Lynchburg.  US 221 connects Independence, Galax, and Hillsville in Southwest Virginia while running concurrently with US 58.  The U.S. Highway connects those communities with Roanoke via Floyd County, within which US 221 is the main west–east highway. The U.S. Highway also runs concurrently with US 460 from Roanoke to Bedford and parallels that U.S. Highway from Bedford to Lynchburg.

Major intersections
Florida
  in Perry
  in Perry
  south-southeast of Greenville
  in Greenville. The highways travel concurrently through Greenville.
Georgia
  in Quitman. The highways travel concurrently to Valdosta.
  in Valdosta
  in Valdosta. US 41/US 221 travels concurrently through Valdosta.
  in Lakeland. The highways travel concurrently to east-northeast of Lakeland.
  south-southwest of Pearson. The highways travel concurrently to Douglas.
  in Pearson
  in Hazlehurst. The highways travel concurrently through Hazlehurst.
  in Mount Vernon
  south of Norristown
  north-northeast of Norristown
  south-southwest of Bartow. The highways travel concurrently to Bartow.
  in Louisville. The highways travel concurrently to Wrens.
  in Wrens
  in Harlem
  south of Appling
South Carolina
  in McCormick. The highways travel concurrently through McCormick.
  south-southeast of Greenwood. The highways travel concurrently to northeast of Greenwood.
  in Laurens
  north of Laurens
  east-northeast of Moore
  in Spartanburg
  north of Spartanburg
  east of Valley Falls
North Carolina
  southwest of Forest City
  in Rutherfordton
  southeast of West Marion
  in Marion
  in Blowing Rock. The siblings travel concurrently to Boone.
  in Boone. The siblings travel in a wrong-way concurrency to north-northeast of Deep Gap.
  in Twin Oaks. US 221 travels concurrently with its parent to Independence, Virginia.
Virginia
  in Independence. US 58/US 221 travels concurrently to Hillsville.
  in Woodlawn
  in Hillsville
  in Roanoke. The highways travel concurrently through Roanoke.
  in Roanoke
  in Roanoke. US 221/US 460 travels concurrently to Bedford.
  in Lynchburg
  in Lynchburg

Special routes

See also

References

External links

 Endpoints of U.S. Highway 221 on USEnds.com

 
21-2
2